The 2023 Suzuki Polish Basketball Cup was the 59th edition of Poland's national cup competition for men basketball teams. It is managed by the Polish Basketball League (PLK) and was held in Lublin, in the Globus.

Qualified teams
The eight participants qualified for the tournament after the first half of the 2022–23 PLK season. The highest-placed three teams joined Start Lublin and would play against the four low-seeded teams in the quarter-finals. As host of the tournament, Start Lublin gained automatic qualification.

Draw
The draw was held on 8 July 2022 in Lublin at Lublin Conference Center.

Bracket

Quarterfinals

Semifinals

Finals

See also
 2022–23 PLK season

References

External links
Official Site
Results page for 2022–23

Polish Basketball Cup
Cup